Gallos Negros de Querétaro (English: Queretaro Black Roosters) are an American football team based in Querétaro City, Mexico. The Gallos Negros compete in the LFA, the top American football league in Mexico. The team was established following the relocation of Condors, one of the charter teams of the league, to Querétaro in November 2021.

History

On 10 November 2021 Commissioner Alejandro Jaimes revealed the Condors would relocate prior to the 2022 LFA season. The team had been acquired by the ownership group of Querétaro football club from Condors' owner Luis Nassar. On 7 December 2021, the move to Querétaro City was made official by LFA authorities and the team was presented as Condors de Querétaro.

On 3 February 2022, the team revealed a new identity and were rebranded as Gallos Negros de Querétaro. Following the rebrand, the league considers Gallos Negros as a new franchise that will begin competing in the 2022 season.

Gallos Negros' roster for the 2022 season was composed in its majority by players who were part of Condors prior to the team's move to Querétaro. In their first year, they made the playoffs as the #6 seed despite having a losing record. Querétaro had made it in their first year to the championship game after winning two playoff games on the road.

Roster

Staff

Season-by-season

References

2021 establishments in Mexico
American football teams established in 2021
Sports teams in Querétaro
Liga de Fútbol Americano Profesional teams
Querétaro City